Crawford is a town in Washington County, Maine, United States. The town was named after William H. Crawford, Secretary of the Treasury. The population was 93 at the 2020 census.

History
Crawford was incorporated on February 11, 1828 under the name Adams, presumably after then-incumbent President, John Q. Adams.  The name was changed to Crawford only 17 days later on February 28, 1828, in honor of former Secretary of Treasury William H. Crawford of Georgia.

Geography

Adjacent municipalities 

 No. 21 Township (north)
 Alexander, Maine (east)
 Cooper, Maine (southeast)
 T19 ED BPP (south)
 Wesley, Maine (southwest)
 T26 ED BPP (west)

Demographics

2010 census
As of the census of 2010, there were 105 people, 48 households, and 32 families living in the town. The racial makeup of the town was 100.0% White. Hispanic or Latino of any race were 1.9% of the population.

There were 48 households, of which 27.1% had children under the age of 18 living with them, 60.4% were married couples living together, 4.2% had a female householder with no husband present, 2.1% had a male householder with no wife present, and 33.3% were non-families. 27.1% of all households were made up of individuals, and 10.4% had someone living alone who was 65 years of age or older. The average household size was 2.19 and the average family size was 2.63.

The median age in the town was 50.5 years. 17.1% of residents were under the age of 18; 4.9% were between the ages of 18 and 24; 11.5% were from 25 to 44; 43.8% were from 45 to 64; and 22.9% were 65 years of age or older. The gender makeup of the town was 44.8% male and 55.2% female.

2000 census
As of the census of 2000, there were 108 people, 41 households, and 31 families living in the town. The population density was 3.1 people per square mile (1.2/km2). There were 99 housing units at an average density of 2.9 per square mile (1.1/km2). The racial makeup of the town was 97.22% White, 0.93% Native American, 0.93% from other races, and 0.93% from two or more races. Hispanic or Latino of any race were 0.93% of the population.

There were 41 households, out of which 29.3% had children under the age of 18 living with them, 58.5% were married couples living together, 12.2% had a female householder with no husband present, and 22.0% were non-families. 17.1% of all households were made up of individuals, and 9.8% had someone living alone who was 65 years of age or older. The average household size was 2.63 and the average family size was 2.88.

In the town, the population was spread out, with 28.7% under the age of 18, 1.9% from 18 to 24, 29.6% from 25 to 44, 22.2% from 45 to 64, and 17.6% who were 65 years of age or older. The median age was 39 years. For every 100 females, there were 100.0 males. For every 100 females age 18 and over, there were 108.1 males.

The median income for a household in the town was $43,125, and the median income for a family was $27,083. Males had a median income of $46,250 versus $25,625 for females. The per capita income for the town was $13,864. There were 24.1% of families and 24.0% of the population living below the poverty line, including 31.3% of under eighteens and 25.9% of those over 64.

References

Towns in Washington County, Maine
Towns in Maine